Ricky Fenson (also Rick Brown; born Richard Brown, 22 May 1945, in Chopwell, County Durham) is a British rock bass guitarist.

The Rolling Stones 
He briefly played with an early version of The Rolling Stones before he was replaced by Bill Wyman and they had their classic lineup. He appeared with the band in 1962 and 1963 with fellow Screaming Lord Sutch and the Savages and Cyril Davies' All Stars band members Carlo Little and Nicky Hopkins, including a gig at Sidcup Art College, Bexley, which Keith Richards had attended. Born Richard Brown, he went under the stage name Ricky Fenson.

Later career

He was also a member of the bands Brian Auger and the Trinity and Steampacket. fellow Screaming Lord Sutch and the Savages and Cyril Davies' All Stars.

Fenson would later play double bass in the London Festival Ballet and then the Scottish Ballet and Opera.

References

External links
 "Rick Brown's memories of the Cyril Davies All Stars and more ..."

Living people
1945 births
People from Gateshead
Musicians from Tyne and Wear
All-Stars (band) members
Screaming Lord Sutch and the Savages members
The Rolling Stones members
Steampacket members
British rock bass guitarists